= 1999 Czech Social Democratic Party leadership election =

1999 ČSSD leadership election
- 11 April 1999
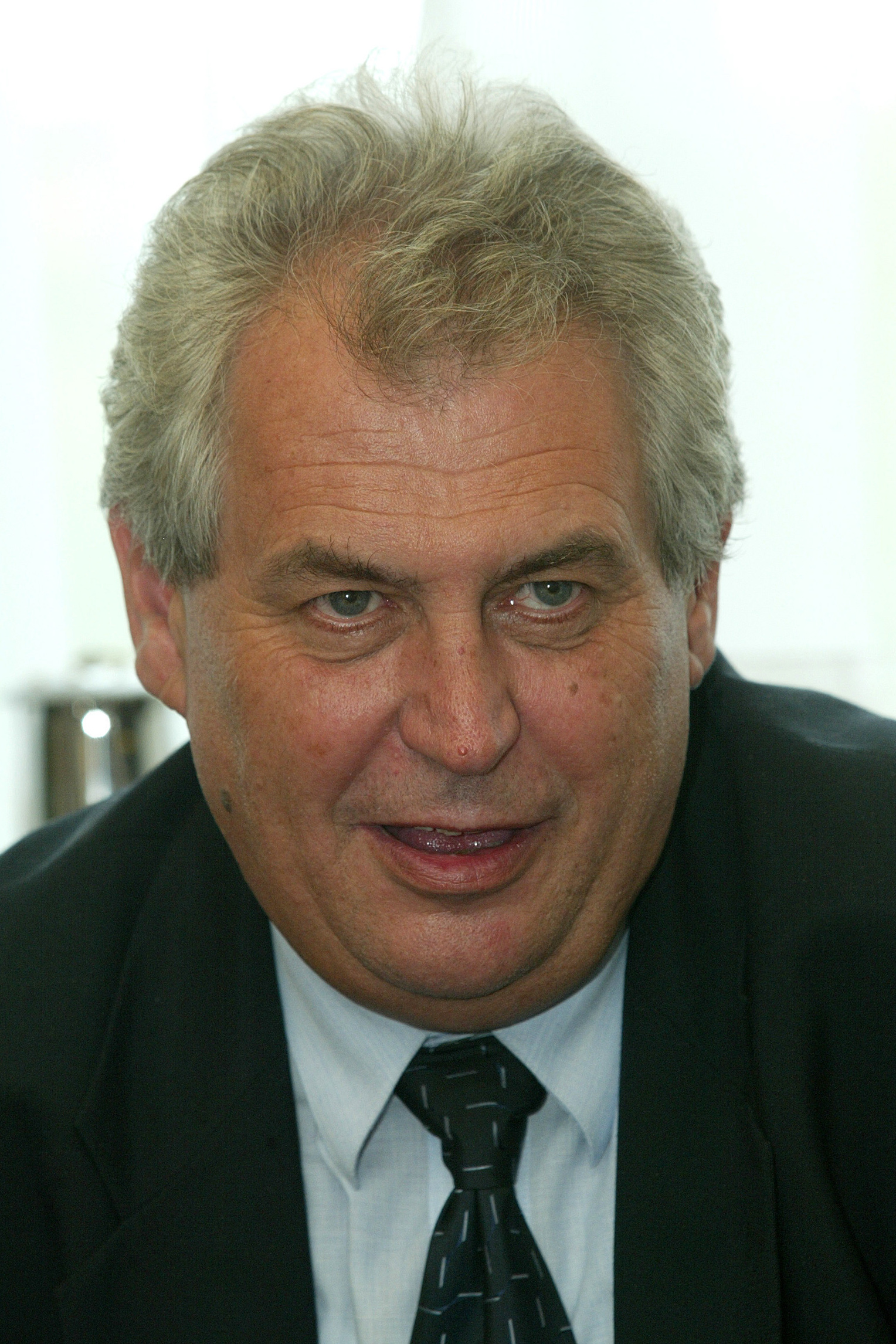
Candidate	Miloš Zeman
Percentage	81%
Leader of ČSSD before election
Miloš Zeman
Elected Leader of ČSSD
Miloš Zeman

The Czech Social Democratic Party (ČSSD) leadership election of 1999 was held on 11 April 1999. Zeman was re-elected for another term. Zeman was the only candidate. He also stated that he won't run for the position in 2001.
